Ludwig Wilhelm (21 June 1831 – 6 November 1920) was a Duke in Bavaria and official head of the ducal branch of the House of Wittelsbach.

Biography
Ludwig Wilhelm (often called Louis) was the eldest child of Duke Maximilian Joseph in Bavaria and Princess Ludovika of Bavaria, and was the brother of Empress Elisabeth of Austria.

He pursued a career in the Royal Bavarian Army, becoming a major in the 1st Royal Bavarian Chevau-légers "Emperor Nicholas of Russia" and rising to the rank of General of the Cavalry by 1859.

Relationships and issue
He renounced his rights as firstborn when he entered into a morganatic marriage to the actress Henriette Mendel, who was created Baroness von Wallersee on their marriage. Louis became father in 1858 of a daughter Marie Louise Mendel, who, as Marie Louise von Larisch-Wallersee ("jene Gräfin Larisch"), was later involved in the Mayerling Incident. In 1859 his son Karl Emanuel was born but died shortly after. 

Henriette died on November 12, 1891.

Louis married a second time to ballet prima donna Antonie Barth, on November 19, 1892 in Munich. The duke was forty years older than his bride, and was not accepted into the duke's family as graciously as his first wife. She was created Baroness von Bartolf. In 1906, the duke had declared his intention to marry Fraulein Tordek, a prima donna of the Munich royal opera house. Bartolf left the duke in 1907 after years of physical and emotional abuse. They divorced in July 1913 after Frau Bartolf gave birth to a daughter, Hélène that the duke claimed was not his child.

Death
In November 1920, Ludwig died of a cardiac arrest-induced stroke and is buried in Munich's Ostfriedhof.

Honours
He received the following orders and decorations:

Ancestry

References

1831 births
1920 deaths
House of Wittelsbach
Dukes in Bavaria
Nobility from Munich
Burials at the Ostfriedhof (Munich)
Recipients of the Military Merit Order (Bavaria)
Grand Crosses of the Order of Saint Stephen of Hungary
Knights of the Golden Fleece of Austria